The African Union Passport is a common passport document that is set to replace existing nationally issued African Union member state passports and exempt bearers from having to obtain any visas for all 55 states in Africa. It was launched on July 17, 2016, at the 27th Ordinary Session of the African Union that was held in Kigali in Rwanda by Rwandan President Paul Kagame and the late Chadian President Idriss Déby. As of June 2018, the passport was planned to be rolled out and ready for use at borders worldwide by 2020, however the rollout has since been delayed into 2021.

Types 

There are three types of African Union passport that will be issued:
 Ordinary passport
 These passports are issued to citizens and are intended for occasional travel, such as vacations and business trips. They contain 32 pages, and are valid for 5 years.

 Official/Service passport
 These passports are issued to officials attached to government institutions who have to travel on official business.

 Diplomatic passport
 Issued to diplomats and consuls for work-related travel, and to their accompanying dependents.

 Temporary passport
 These passports are issued to travelling citizens or natives of African countries that cannot get hold of their passports due to various reasons including robbery, thiefty or accidents. They may last for 6 months to a year.

Design 
The passport has inscriptions in Arabic, English, French, Portuguese, and Swahili. The African Union anthem's lyrics are printed on the page immediately after the picture page.

References

See also
Interpol Travel Document
 African Union (staff) passport information on PRADO

Passports
African Union
2016 introductions